Prečani was a Serbian blanket term used at the end of the 19th- and early 20th century for ethnic Serb communities located  ("across") the Danube, Sava and Drina rivers, beyond the northern and western borders of 19th-century Serbia, that is, in Austria-Hungary-held Vojvodina, Bosnia and Herzegovina and Croatia. It was thus used to distinguish Serbs of Serbia ("Serbians") from those in the historical Habsburg monarchy; it was not applied to the Serbs of Montenegro or those in the Sanjak of Novi Pazar and elsewhere in the Ottoman Empire. 

In the Habsburg lands – in Kingdom of Dalmatia, the Serbs established the Serb People's Party, while in the Kingdom of Croatia-Slavonia they established the Serb Independent Party. In 1918 the Prečani Serbs formed a notable political constituency that participated in the founding of the State of Slovenes, Croats and Serbs as well as the joining of Banat, Bačka and Baranja with the Kingdom of Serbia. In the first Yugoslavia, their political party, the Independent Democratic Party was important in national politics. After the invasion of Yugoslavia, they were the main target of the World War II persecution of Serbs.

The term was primarily used in the Kingdom of Serbia and was not used by the Austro-Hungarian Serbs themselves. Today, the Prečani constitute the Serbs of Bosnia and Herzegovina, Serbs of Croatia and Serbs in Vojvodina.

Annotations

Further reading

History of the Serbs
History of the Serbs of Croatia
History of the Serbs of Bosnia and Herzegovina
Serbs of Vojvodina
Austro-Hungarian Serbs
Political history of Serbia
19th century in Serbia
Political terminology of Serbia